Nova Veneza (a Portuguese name meaning "New Venice") is a Brazilian municipality located in Santa Catarina, Southern Brazil. It has 15,342 inhabitants and was settled by immigrants from Venice in 1891.

People of Venetian descent make up 95% of the population.

References

Municipalities in Santa Catarina (state)